Khana is a Local Government Area in Rivers State, Nigeria. Its administrative seat is in the town of Bori.

It has an area of 560 km and a population estimated about 294,217 at the 2006 census. The local language is the Khana language.

The postal code of the area is 504.

References

Khana has three Districts Namely, Nyokhana, Kenkhana and Babbe. This three districts form part of the Six kingdoms in Ogoni.

Some of the villages in Nyokhana are Bunu-Bangha, Nyobe-Bangha, Lumene-Bangha, Kabangha, Kere-Bangha, Koro-Bangha, Luekue-Bangha, Bionu-Bangha, Opuoko, Kalaoko, Bianu, Taabaa, Kpong, Beeri, Nyokuru, Sogho, Okwale, Lueku, Lorre, Yae, Daen, etc.

Some of the villages in Kenkhana are Bane, Kono, Kwawa, Buan, Luubara, Duburo, Pue, Kpean, Baen, Eweh, Bane, Wiiyaakara, Kaani etc.

Some of the villages in Babbe are Boue, Kaa, Sii, Zaakpon, Kanni-Babbe, Gwara, Eeeken, Betem, Luawii, etc.

Notable names from the area in no ranking are: Prof. Don Baridam, Prof. L.C Micah, Dr. Owen Wiwa, Rear Admiral Bakpo, Sir. O.B Deemua, Prof. Sam Nwideeduh, Monsgr Pius Kii, Prof. JB Kinanee to mention but few.
Major government institution: Ken Saro Wiwa Polytechnic (formerly, Rivers State Polytechnic), Bori
Nigeria Postal Service, Bori
General Hospital, Bori
Nigeria Police Force, Division and Area Command
Rivers State Judiciary (High Court), Bori
 
Major occupation: Farming
Markets: Dumua, Dusor, DuBori

Reference: Nwisane, Clifford Bariton

Local Government Areas in Rivers State
1992 establishments in Nigeria
1990s establishments in Rivers State